Benny Peter Agbayani, Jr. (born December 28, 1971) is an American retired professional baseball player. He attended Saint Louis School, Hawaii Pacific University and the Oregon Institute of Technology. He played in Major League Baseball (MLB) for the New York Mets, Colorado Rockies and Boston Red Sox and Nippon Professional Baseball (NPB) for the Chiba Lotte Marines.

Career

Minor leagues
He was originally drafted by the California Angels but did not sign. Agbayani was later drafted in the 30th round by the New York Mets on June 3, 1993. He became a local star at the Triple-A minor league team, the Norfolk Tides. He has since been part of the Boston Red Sox, Colorado Rockies, Cincinnati Reds, and Kansas City Royals organizations. He last played for the Chiba Lotte Marines in the Japanese Pacific League.

New York Mets
Agbayani made his major league debut with the New York Mets on June 17, 1998, as part of an 8th-inning double-switch in which he defensively replaced center fielder Butch Huskey during a 5–4 loss to the Montreal Expos. He made his first start and picked up his first big league hit on June 19. Agbayani led off the bottom of the first inning by singling to second base off Florida Marlins pitcher Brian Meadows.

His 11 home runs prior to the All Star break in 1999 was the second-most by a Mets rookie, behind Ron Swoboda (15, in 1965); Ike Davis also had 11 in 2010. Swoboda's record was subsequently annihilated by Peter Alonso in 2019.

On August 12, 2000, while a member of the Mets, Agbayani was involved in a particularly memorable play. In the fourth inning, with the Mets leading 1–0, the Giants loaded the bases after a double, an error, and a hit batsman. With one out, Giants catcher Bobby Estalella hit a fly pop to Agbayani in left field. Agbayani, thinking that the catch made three outs, gave the ball to a child, Jake Burns, in the stands and began to trot toward the dugout. Upon realizing his mistake, Agbayani sprinted back to the stands, pulled the ball from the hands of Burns, and fired a throw toward home plate. Unfortunately for Agbayani, once the ball left the field, the play was dead, and all three runners were awarded two bases—causing Jeff Kent and Ellis Burks to score, and the Giants to take the lead, 2–1. The Mets went on to win the game, 3–2, and Agbayani gave another ball to the fan who had given the previous one back.

Agbayani is also fondly remembered by Mets fans for two clutch home runs hit during the 2000 season, earning him the nickname "Hawaiian Punch" (after the popular fruit drink). On March 30, his 11th inning grand slam against the Chicago Cubs gave the Mets their first win of the season, and a split in the two-game series the Mets and Cubs played in Tokyo, Japan. (It remained the only regular-season MLB grand slam ever hit in Japan until Domingo Santana hit a grand slam for the Seattle Mariners vs the Oakland Athletics on March 20, 2019.) Later that year, on October 7, he hit a game-winning home run in the 13th inning of Game 3 of the National League Division Series against Aaron Fultz of the Giants. Agbayani also drove in the winning run in the only game the Mets won in the 2000 World Series.

Colorado Rockies
On January 21, 2002, Agbayani was part of a 10-player, three-team trade between the Mets, Rockies and Milwaukee Brewers, that sent him from New York to Colorado. He struggled in 48 games with the Rockies, hitting .205 with four home runs and 19 RBI before he was placed on waivers in late August.

Boston Red Sox
The Boston Red Sox selected Agbayani off waivers from the Rockies on August 26, 2002, as the club made a drive for the playoffs. He played relatively well down the stretch, hitting .297 and driving in eight runs in 37 at-bats over 13 games with Boston. In his final MLB game, September 29, Agbayani went 1-for-4 with a walk and a strikeout as the Red Sox defeated the Tampa Bay Devil Rays at Fenway Park.

Nippon Professional Baseball
On October 26, 2005, Agbayani and the Chiba Lotte Marines swept the Hanshin Tigers in 4 games during the Japan Series. This was the Marines' first title in 31 years. On November 13, 2005, they won the inaugural Asia Series after defeating the champions of South Korea, China, and Taiwan. They defeated the Samsung Lions in the championship and Agbayani was named MVP of the series. Agbayani's manager with Chiba Lotte was his manager with the Mets, Bobby Valentine. He retired following the 2009 season, his sixth in Japan.

Personal life 
Agbayani and his wife Niela have three children; daughters Aleia and Ailana and son Bruin. Aleia currently attends UC Berkeley and plays for their softball team. He is of Samoan, Filipino, Hawaiian, Chinese and Portuguese descent.

Following his retirement, Agbayani was hired as an educational assistant at Mililani High School in Oahu in 2010.

Agbayani is currently a ramp agent for Hawaiian Airlines. He is also the softball head coach at ʻIolani School in Honolulu, where both of his daughters attended as well as played softball.

Career and achievements
Agbayani is one of ten known players in Major League Baseball history with a Filipino background, either by birth, citizenship, or heritage.
He is a 1989 inductee of Hawaii High School Athletic Association Hall Of Honor. His daughter Ailana, whom he coached in softball at ʻIolani School, is a 2022 inductee.
Despite having only limited and occasional success in the Major Leagues, Agbayani was a popular figure with fans, particular in New York, where his successes were often met with "Benny, Benny!" chants as well as "Benny and the Mets", a parody of Elton John's Bennie and the Jets.

References

External links

 Baseball Reference minor league statistics
 MLB historical statistics

1971 births
Living people
American baseball players of Filipino descent
American expatriate baseball players in Japan
American people of Samoan descent
Baseball players from Honolulu
Binghamton Mets players
Boston Red Sox players
Chiba Lotte Marines players
Colorado Rockies players
Colorado Springs Sky Sox players
Hawaii Pacific Sharks baseball players
Hawaiian Airlines
Major League Baseball outfielders
Major League Baseball replacement players
Native Hawaiian people of Filipino descent
New York Mets players
Nippon Professional Baseball designated hitters
Norfolk Tides players
Omaha Royals players
Oregon Institute of Technology alumni
Pawtucket Red Sox players
Saint Louis School alumni
American people of Ilocano descent
Cañeros de Los Mochis players
American expatriate baseball players in Mexico
Pittsfield Mets players
St. Lucie Mets players